Eucalyptus canescens, commonly known as the Ooldea Range mallee  or Beadell's mallee, depending on subspecies, is a species of mallee that is endemic to southern Australia. It has rough bark from the base of the trunk to the thicker branches, smooth bark on the thin branches, egg-shaped to lance-shaped adult leaves, flower buds in groups of between seven and eleven, creamy white flowers and smooth cup-shaped to conical, and sometimes ribbed fruit.

Description

Taxonomy and naming
Eucalyptus canescens was first formally described in 1998 by Dean Nicolle, and the description was published in the journal Nuytsia. The specific epithet (canescens) is a Latin word meaning "grey" or "hoary", referring to the grey general appearance of the type subspecies.

Nicolle described two subspecies that have been accepted by the Australian Plant Census:
 Eucalyptus canescens subsp. canescens, the Ooldea Range mallee, has its twigs, buds and fruit covered with a powdery white bloom, greyish leaves and more strongly ribbed fruit;
 Eucalyptus canescens subsp. beadellii, Beadell's mallee, lacks the whitish bloom.

The name beadellii commemorates the surveyor and explorer Len Beadell.

Distribution and habitat
Subspecies canescens grows on sand dunes or on sand plains in the southern part of the Great Victoria Desert from near Cook to near Maralinga in South Australia and extending into Western Australia. Subspecies beadellii is rare, only known from near the Cook-Vokes Hill track.

See also
List of Eucalyptus species

References

Trees of Australia
canescens
Myrtales of Australia
Flora of South Australia
Eucalypts of Western Australia
Plants described in 1997